Acacia gibbosa is a shrub or tree belonging to the genus Acacia and the subgenus Juliflorae native to Western Australia.

Description
The green to grey-green, glabrous, terete phyllodes have a narrowly linear, straight to shallowly incurved flat shape. It blooms between August and September producing yellow flowers. The simple inflorescences are arranged with two per axil.

Taxonomy
The species was first formally described by the botanists Richard Sumner Cowan and Bruce Maslin in 1995 as part of the work Acacia Miscellany. New taxa and notes on previously described taxa of Acacia, mostly section Juliflorae (Leguminosae: Mimosoideae), in Western Australia as published in the journal Nuytsia. In 2003 Leslie Pedley reclassified the species as Racosperma gibbosum but in 2006 it was transferred back to the genus Acacia. The plant is often confused with Acacia cyperophylla and is closely related to Acacia websteri.

Distribution
It is endemic to an area in the Wheatbelt and the Goldfields regions of Western Australia where it is found on and around low-lying areas and undulating plains growing in sandy or loamy soils.

See also
 List of Acacia species

References

gibbosa
Acacias of Western Australia
Plants described in 1995
Taxa named by Bruce Maslin
Taxa named by Richard Sumner Cowan